Mugsy or Muggsy may refer to:

Nickname
Muggsy Bogues (born 1965), American basketball player-coach
Muggsy Spanier (1901–1967), American jazz cornet player
John McGraw (1873–1934), American baseball player and manager
Owen Mulligan (born 1981), Irish Gaelic football player

Fictional characters
Mugsy of Rocky and Mugsy, gangsters in Looney Tunes shorts
A bank robber in the 1953 film Abbott and Costello Go to Mars
A henchman of the Ventriloquist in Batman: The Animated Series
A waiter in the 1995 play Dealer's Choice by Patrick Marber

Other uses
 Mugsy (video game), a 1980s computer game, also the title character
 A mascot for the Salem Red Sox baseball affiliate
 Mugsy, a humor strip in the American anthology comic book series Zip Comics

Lists of people by nickname